St. Paul Block, also known as the Hermann-Brownlow Building and Hermann-Sanford Building, is a historic commercial building located at Springfield, Greene County, Missouri. It was built in 1905, and is a three-story, brick commercial building with a flat roof and open storefronts.

It was listed on the National Register of Historic Places in 2009.

References

Commercial buildings on the National Register of Historic Places in Missouri
Commercial buildings completed in 1905
Buildings and structures in Springfield, Missouri
National Register of Historic Places in Greene County, Missouri
1905 establishments in Missouri